The Artuqid dynasty (alternatively Artukid, Ortoqid, or Ortokid; , pl. ;) was a Turkoman dynasty originated from  tribe that ruled in eastern Anatolia, Northern Syria and Northern Iraq in the eleventh through thirteenth centuries. The Artuqid dynasty took its name from its founder, Artuk Bey, who was of the Döger branch of the Oghuz Turks and ruled one of the Turkmen beyliks of the Seljuk Empire. Artuk's sons and descendants ruled the three branches in the region: Sökmen's descendants ruled the region around Hasankeyf between 1102 and 1231; Ilghazi's branch ruled from Mardin and Mayyafariqin between 1106 and 1186 (until 1409 as vassals) and Aleppo from 1117–1128; and the Harput line starting in 1112 under the Sökmen branch, and was independent between 1185 and 1233.

History 

The dynasty was founded by Artuk, son of Eksük, a general originally under Malik-Shah I and then under the Seljuk emir of Damascus, Tutush I. Tutush appointed Artuk governor of Jerusalem in 1086. Artuk died in 1091, and was succeeded by his sons Sökmen and Ilghazi who were expelled from Jerusalem by the Fatimid vizier al-Afdal Shahanshah in 1098; the Fatimids lost the city to the Crusaders the following year after the siege of Jerusalem of 1099.

Sökmen and Ilghazi established themselves in Diyarbakır, Mardin, and Hasankeyf in al-Jazira where they came into conflict with the Seljuk sultanate. Sökmen, bey of Mardin, defeated the Crusaders at the Battle of Harran in 1104. Ilghazi succeeded Sökmen in Mardin and imposed his control over Aleppo at the request of the qadi Ibn al-Khashshab in 1118. The next year, Ilghazi defeated the Crusader state Principality of Antioch at the Battle of Ager Sanguinis of 1119.

After pillaging the County of Edessa, Ilghazi made peace with the crusaders. In 1121, he went north towards Armenia with his son-in-law Mazyad Dubais II ibn Sadaqah and Sultan Malik of Ganja.  Ilghazi invaded Georgia and was defeated by David IV of Georgia at the Battle of Didgori of 1121. Ilghazi died in 1122, and although his nephew Belek Ghazi nominally controlled Aleppo, the city was really controlled by ibn al-Khashshab. Ibn al-Kashshab was murdered by Assassins in 1125, and Aleppo fell under the control of Zengi, atabeg of Mosul, in 1128. After the death of Belek Ghazi, the Artuqids were split between Harput, Hasankeyf and Mardin. Sokman's son Rukn al-Dawla Dāʾūd, bey of Hasankeyf, died in 1144, and was succeeded by his son Kara Aslan. Kara Aslan allied with Joscelin II of Edessa against the Zengids, and while Joscelin was away in 1144, Zengi recaptured Edessa, the first of the Crusader states to fall (see Siege of Edessa). Hasankeyf became a vassal of Zengi as well.

Kara Aslan's son Nūr al-Dīn Muḥammad allied with the Ayyubid sultan Saladin against Kilij Arslan II, Seljuk sultan of Rûm, whose daughter had married Nur ad-Din Muhammad. In the peace settlement with Kilij Arslan II, Saladin gained control of the Artuqid territory, even though the Artuqids were still technically vassals of Mosul, which Saladin did not yet control. With Artuqid support, however, Saladin eventually took control of Mosul as well, transferring the rule from nominal Seljuk Empire to the Ayyubid Sultanate by late 1180s. The Seljuk Empire completely disintegrated soon after that in 1194.

The Artuqid dynasty remained in nominal command of al-Jazira, but their power declined under Ayyubid rule. The Hasankeyf branch conquered Diyarbakır in 1198 and its center was moved here, but was demolished by the Ayyubids in 1231 when it attempted to form an alliance with the Seljuks. The Harput branch was destroyed by the Sultanate of Rum due to following a slippery policy between the Ayyubids and Seljuqs. The Mardin branch survived for longer, but as a vassal of the Ayyubids, Sultanate of Rûm, Il-Khanate and the Timurids. The Kara Koyunlu captured Mardin and finally put an end to Artuqid rule in 1409.

List of rulers 
The major branches of the Artuqid dynasty were those based in Hasankeyf, Harput, Mardin and Aleppo.

Hasankeyf branch
This branch was initially based at Hasankeyf (Ḥiṣn Kaifā). The capital moved to Diyarbakır (Amid) in 1183.

Sökmen, son of Artuk, 1102–1104
Ibrahim of Ḥiṣn Kaifā, son of Sökmen, 1104–1109
Rukn al-Dawla Dāʾūd (Dāʾūd), son of Sökmen, 1109–1144
Kara Arslan, son of Dāʾūd, 1144–1174)
Nūr al-Dīn Muḥammad, son of Kara Arslan, 1174–1185
Sökmen II, son of Nūr al-Dīn Muḥammad, 1185–1201
Nāṣir al-Dīn Maḥmūd, son of Nūr al-Dīn Muḥammad, 1201–1222
Rukn al-Dīn Mawdūd, son of Nāṣir al-Dīn Maḥmūd, 1222–1232/33.

Following the rule of Rukn al-Dīn Mawdūd, the territories of the Hasankeyf branch of the Artuqids were taken over by the Ayyubids.

Harput branch 

The Harput branch was initially part of the Hasankeyf branch until 1185, gaining independence from Kara Arslan.

 Imad ud-din Abu Bakr, son of Kara Arslan, 1185–1204
 Ibrahim ibn Abu Bakr, son of Abu Bakr, 1203–1223
 Ahmad Khidr, son of Ibrahim, 1223–1234
 Artuq Shah, son of Ahmad Khidr, 1234.

Harput was conquered by Kayqubad I, Seljuk sultan of Rûm, in 1234, as part of his conquering of Anatolia.

Mardin branch 

The Mardin branch of the Artuqids ruled in Mardin and Mayyafariqin from 1101–1409 and were primarily descendants of Ilghazi and his brother Alp-Yaruq.

Yāqūti, son of Alp-Yaruq (son of Artuk), 1101–1104
'Ali ibn Yāqūti, son of Yāqūti, 1104
Sökmen, son of Artuk, 1104–1115
Ilghazi, son of Artuk, 1115–1122
Timurtash, son of Ilghazi, 1122–1154
Alpï I, son of Timurtash, 1154–1176
Ilghazi II, son of Alpï I, 1176–1184
 Yülük Arslan, son of Ilghazi II, 1184–1203
 Artuk Arslan, son of Yülük Arslan, 1203–1239
 Al-Sa'id Najm al-Din Ghazi I, son of Yülük Arslan, 1239–1260
 Al-Muzaffar Fakhr al-Din Kara Arslan, son of Ghazi I, 1260–1292
 Al-Sa'id Shams al-Din Dāwūd I, son of al-Muzaffar Fakhr al-Din Kara Arslan, 1292–1294
 Al-Mansur Najm al-Din Ghazi II, son of al-Muzaffar Fakhr al-Din Kara Arslan, 1294–1312
 'Ali Alpï II, son of Ghazi II, 1312
 As-Salih Shams al-Din Mahmūd (Mahmūd), son of Ghazi II, 1312–1364
 Al-Mansur Husam al-Din Ahmad, son of Mahmūd, 1364–1367
 As-Salih Shams al-Din Mahmūd (second rule), 1367
 Al-Muzaffar Fakhr al-Din Dāwūd II, son of Mahmūd, 1367–1376
 Al-Zahir Majd al-Din 'Isā, son of Dāwūd II, 1376–1407
 Al-Salih Şhihab al-Din Ahmad, son of Al-Zahir Majd al-Din 'Isā, 1407–1409.

Mardin was conquered the Kara Koyunlu, a Turkmen tribe, in 1409.

Aleppo subbranch 
The Artuqid branch that ruled Aleppo was an offshoot of the Mardin branch and included descendants of Ilghazi and his brothers Abd al-Jabar and Bahram ibn Artuk. See also Rulers of Aleppo.

 Ilghazi, son of Artuk, 1117–1121
 Badr ad-Dawlah Süleiman, son of Abd al-Jabar (son of Artuk), 1121–1123
 Belek Ghazi, son of Bahram ibn Artuk (son of Artuk), 1123–1124
 Timurtash, son of Ilghazi, 1124–1125
 [Seljuks under al-Bursuqi and various others, 1125–1127]
 Badr ad-Dawlah Süleiman (second rule), 1127–1128.

Aleppo was taken by Zengi in 1128 and ruled by the Zengid dynasty until 1183.

Art 

Despite their constant preoccupation with war, members of the Artuqid dynasty left many architectural monuments.  Artuqid rulers commissioned many public buildings, such as mosques, bazaars, bridges, hospitals and baths for the benefit of their subjects. They left an important cultural heritage by contributing to literature and the art of metalworking. The door and door handles of the great Mosque of Cizre are unique examples of Artuqid metal working craftsmanship, which can be seen in the Turkish and Islamic Arts Museum in Istanbul, Turkey.

They made the most significant additions to Diyarbakır City Walls. Urfa Gate was rebuilt by Muhammad, son of Kara Arslan. In the same area of the western wall, south of Urfa Gate, two imposing towers, Ulu Beden and Yedi Kardeş were commissioned in 1208 by the Artuqid ruler Nāṣir al-Dīn Maḥmūd who designed the Yedi Kardeş tower himself and apposed the Artuqid double-headed eagle on its walls.

A large caravanserai in Mardin as well as the civil engineering feat of Malabadi Bridge are still in regular use in our day. The partially standing Old Bridge, Hasankeyf, was built in 1116 by Kara Arslan.

The Great Mosques of Mardin and Silvan were possibly but in any case considerably developed over the 12th century by several Artuqid rulers on the basis of existing Seljuk edifices. The congregational mosque of Dunaysir (now Kızıltepe) was commissioned by Yülük Arslan (1184–1203) and completed after his death in 1204 by his brother Artuk Arslan (1203–1239).

Coinage

See also 
List of Sunni Muslim dynasties
Artuklu Palace

References

Sources

External links 
 
 

 
Anatolian beyliks
History of Diyarbakır Province
History of Mardin Province
Muslims of the Crusades
States and territories established in 1102
Medieval Upper Mesopotamia
States and territories disestablished in the 1400s
12th-century establishments in the Seljuk Empire